Chris Fleming (born January 29, 1987) is an American comedian and actor best known for his YouTube series Gayle, in which he stars as the eponymous character Gayle Waters-Waters. In June 2019, Variety named Fleming one of its "10 Comics to Watch for 2019".

Fleming is known for his unique, specific character comedy and "powerful, ridiculous songs." Much of Fleming's comedy is aimed at deconstructing social norms, including masculinity. He has been described as accruing an online cult following.

A staff writer for FSUNews covering an appearance at Florida State University praised his stand-up's underlying message, stating, "Fleming does not seem to give too much respect to anything, including himself, which allows him to rid different social norms and constructs of their power."

Fleming has been described as a "progressive gender-bending role model." Fleming has stated that she accepts any pronouns, stating, "Anything works for me."

Early life and education 
Fleming grew up in Stow, Massachusetts and attended Nashoba Regional High School. During his junior year, he began stand-up comedy at The Comedy Studio in Cambridge, Massachusetts, studying under Rick Jenkins.

In 2007, Fleming performed stand-up during HBO's 13th annual Comedy Festival in Aspen, Colorado.

He received a degree in theater from Skidmore College in 2009, and graduated one credit short of receiving a minor in dance.

Gayle
Gayle is a 40-episode, absurdist comedy series on YouTube. The series is written by Fleming and directed by comedian Melissa Strype, who also plays Gayle's daughter, Terry Gross Waters-Waters. It was launched in 2012 and its final episode was published in 2015.

The series follows high-strung, eccentric suburban mother Gayle Waters-Waters and her ruthless journey to uphold social status in the small community of Northbread, Massachusetts. Fleming developed the idea for Gayle through his stand-up comedy. In 2019, Fleming described the origin of her character:I did Gayle in my stand-up and she was inspired by a lot of folks that I saw growing up...It kind of cemented as ideas do in a very singular moment when I was in a Crate & Barrel and I saw a woman diving into a barrel of placemats. Like her legs were up in the air, and she was just digging through these placemats...it just kind of came from there...I just plucked her from a tree...I have elements of her in my psyche too; it's not gender-specific thing. It's fear of how you're seen in your community, that's what it is, that's the essence of it...Why I related to her so much is just that terror of how others perceive you.Fleming's mother co-stars as Bonnie, Gayle's best friend and biggest rival (i.e., frenemy). Gayle's sensitive birdwatching husband, Dave, does not reveal his face during Gayle; his voice is provided by Fleming, while his legs are portrayed by Fleming's father.

The soundtrack was composed by Brian Heveron-Smith, Tom Lowery, and Chris Hartford. The series is filmed in Fleming's hometown in Massachusetts.

Forbes reported that, in the off-seasons of filming Gayle, Fleming worked as an SAT tutor.

Circa 2013, comedian Margaret Cho grew an interest in the show. In 2013, she guest starred in the episode "Chibby Point" as Yo-Yo Ma, whom Gayle kidnapped from a Barnes & Noble.

In 2014, the Gayle team went on a US tour with the show titled Gayle Live.

Although much of his hometown supports the series - with some neighbors even participating as actors - Fleming claims:There's one woman, who a lot of [Gayle] was inspired by, who is NOT happy about it, at all...[she's] absolutely pissed [because her full name is used for a background character]. I forget to change people's names sometimes, so a lot of my life has been trying to explain to people's faces that something that is very obviously about them is not about them.

Fleming has expressed regret that COMPANY IS COMING, a viral 2015 short featuring Gayle, is the series' best known project and "what I get stopped at airports for." He dislikes when Gayle is known purely as a "crazy mom character," claiming her character transcends the stereotype: I've played that character for so long I have such love for her...there's so many different facets to her. That's just one part of her being. I hate that that's what people think of her in general. There's so many other beautiful shades to her psyche.

Sketch comedy 
Fleming runs a YouTube channel under his full name; the channel has gained over 436,000 subscribers as of May 2022. In addition to Gayle, Fleming has a variety of other content that ranges from music videos to car rants. He also posts videos on his Twitter and Instagram pages.

His 2015 video "COMPANY IS COMING," starring his Gayle character, went viral, accruing over 13.9 million views as of May 2022. In 2018, Fleming has lampooned this viral video as a Faustian bargain with a demon named Davis, who says, "We made a deal; one viral video in 2015 for a lifetime of servitude! You promised me your soul for your video COMPANY IS COMING going viral, and now sorority girls from the South like you for all the wrong reasons!"

Fleming is known for his specific, unique character comedy.

In 2020, he created "Sick Jan," a song and music video detailing his former H&R Block tax preparer who exhibited unusual behavior that intrigued Fleming. In 2022, New York magazine interviewed him based on Sick Jan's similarities to Deirdre, a character in 2022 film Everything Everywhere All At Once. Fleming stated,Jan's not an archetype, Jan's such a specific woman. ... [The] story of Sick Jan, the character herself, is so dense — maybe it's just that all tax preparers have a vibe of anarchy and Southwestern style. With Jan, obviously, it was one song, so I could focus only on the fact that she was chronically sick for three years and never addressed it. And also her desire to go to jail — her overwhelming desire. People talk about sexual tension in the video a lot, but it's just between Jan and the prison system. ... I remember putting her on speakerphone so my friends could hear her, because she would use this catchphrase while also coughing.In 2020, Fleming stated that "Sick Jan" and "DePiglio" are his personal favorite of his YouTube videos.

In 2022, Fleming created a mockumentary-style interview with an eccentric male character who explains his invention of the word "umpteenth."

Stand-up comedy 
In 2010, the 24-year-old Fleming moved to Los Angeles after signing with the talent agency who managed Dane Cook. Fleming has stated, "I was signed to a manager who seduced me to moving out to L.A., and as soon as I got there, she promptly became a chef."

In 2011, describing Fleming's brand of comedy, Jenkins stated, "Chris isn't a funny comedian; he's an interesting person who sees the world in a funny way. Chris's world is this rubbery, cartoonish, absurd place filled with over-the-top, self-important characters. It's a really cool world he shows us."

In January 2012, Fleming's friend, comedian Gary Gulman, invited to Fleming to a party to meet successful L.A. comedians from Boston. Upon arriving, Fleming realized he was at comedian Dane Cook's house, and it was a watch party of the NFL playoff between the Patriots and the Ravens. While receiving a tour of the house, Fleming complimented its appearance, comparing it to a Crate & Barrel; Cook was not amused by the joke. Dressed in androgynous clothing and having no knowledge about football, Fleming felt "freak[ed] out" and claims to have lost his sense of spatial awareness. He sat on Bill Burr's armrest "like a toy breed," eventually humiliating himself by sneezing "directly into the pleat of Bill Burr's khakis." During his 2020 Boba Everyday tour, Fleming describes the experience in detail. On January 22, 2012, Dane Cook tweeted a photographic lineup of comedians at the party, including Fleming. Fleming displayed this photo at the end of the stand-up routine as photographic evidence of the described party. Fleming lampoons their differences in appearance by displaying the Bostonian comedians with a Dropkick Murphys song; then his own face accompanied by "Last Christmas" by Wham!

In 2016 and 2017 he toured the United States with his stand-up comedy show titled Showpig. When asked the meaning of the title, Fleming stated, "I fancy myself a showpig – grease me up and send me to market!"

Describing his comedic process to WBUR in 2019, Fleming said,I burn the formula every time I make something. I really revel in making things that no one is asking for. I think it might be the nature of being anti-establishment is like, when people like something they're like "Oh we want more of this," I'm going to give them something completely out of left-field. I think that's a way to make inspired work. To follow yourself and not to follow what David Bowie called "The Gallery."Fleming is likely referring to Bowie's advice for young artists, in which Bowie says, "Never play for the gallery...Never work for other people at what you do."

Fleming's stand-up tour entitled Boba Everyday began in late 2019 and was postponed until 2021 due to the COVID-19 pandemic. In October 2020, Fleming announced Forest Musings, a virtual show. In August 2021, Fleming announced his stand-up tour, Tricky Tricky. In May 2022, he announced a summer stand-up tour with venues in British Columbia, Texas, New York, Ontario, and Vermont.

When Vulture asked for the best comedy advice he had received, Fleming responded, "Rick Jenkins, owner of the Comedy Studio [in Harvard Square], taught me that, through clarity with your audience, even the most absurd idea can be accessible - also, that no idea is too absurd."

Gender identity 
Fleming lampooned his audience's questions about his gender in a 2016 video titled "Am I A Man?" His response was, "Can I consider myself a man if, in a pinch, I can dry myself off with a hand towel?"

When asked for his preferred pronouns in a 2019 The Peak interview, Fleming stated, "Anything works for me."
In 2016, Fleming defined manhood as:My concept of a man is someone who whacks their elbow a little bit at a Bertucci's and has no hang-ups about freaking out - zero qualms about going full Streetcar Named Desire at 2 PM...Fleming satirizes his relationship with masculinity in his comedy, such as with his 2016 song "I'm Afraid to Talk To Men" and 2022 monologue "Men and Me." When asked if he felt secure in his masculinity, he responded,  Oh, I'm not secure with my masculinity, I just don't have any masculinity. There's just such a lack of it, I have no respect for it. Fleming routinely describes the way he is perceived by others in his stand-up. In regards to his appearance, he has compared himself to "a cocker-spaniel who is bi at best," "a woman...from the woods [who is] deeply ill," and "an American Girl doll that got left out in the rain." In 2022, he stated, "If I'm at a restaurant with a group, the waiter will ask the women, me, children, then men. That's the order of operations...I've got a Gaia thing going on, Mother Goose energy."

Filmography

Pilot 
Beginning in about 2019, Fleming created WarnerMedia/Adult Swim pilot "I'm the Mayor of Bimmi Gardens." The pilot was shot in Atlanta, Georgia in the summer of 2021. It featured Fleming as the protagonist, a "mayor of a town off the coast of Florida (but technically a territory of Maine)." Other actors included Victoria Pedretti, Perfume Genius, and Ms. Pat.

In 2022, Fleming told Vulture, "[The pilot] didn't get picked up by the network that we made it for, so we're trying to get it somewhere else." On August 3, 2022, Fleming shared screenshots of the pilot along with captions explaining scenes and thanking the actors.

Film

Television

References

External links

 
 Rising comic Chris Fleming chases stand-up dream in LA – The Boston Globe
 Local Comedian Chris Fleming Brings Fictional Local Web Character 'Gayle' to Boston Stage  – BDCwire
 Meet Chris Fleming, a Man Who's Man Enough to Admit He's Afraid to Talk to Men - LA Weekly

1987 births
Living people
21st-century American comedians
21st-century American male actors
American male television actors
American stand-up comedians
American YouTubers
American LGBT actors
LGBT people from Massachusetts
LGBT YouTubers
Comedians from Massachusetts
People from Stow, Massachusetts
Skidmore College alumni